Woodley is an unincorporated community in Benson Rural Municipality No. 35, Saskatchewan, Canada.

Demographics 

Woodley, like many other small communities throughout Saskatchewan, has struggled to maintain a steady population causing it to become a semi ghost town. Although numbers are dwindling, it has had a spike (with renewed oil exploration) in recent influx. It is now the snowmobile capital of the world, and may be the toy capital of the world with sleds equalling more than the population. This community flourishes with a younger generation, giving it unique limited growth to a select few families. This community is unique to its surroundings with famous visitors randomly appearing in the area.

Heritage sites 
 St Luke's Lutheran church built in 1929 by Emil Kraus.

See also 
 List of communities in Saskatchewan

References 

Benson No. 35, Saskatchewan
Unincorporated communities in Saskatchewan
Ghost towns in Saskatchewan
Division No. 1, Saskatchewan